Arne Melchior (22 October 1924 – 24 September 2016) was a Danish politician of Jewish descent and supporter of Jewish causes. He was the son of Marcus Melchior.

Melchior was active in the Social Democratic Party but left this party in 1973 to co-found the Centre Democrats.

He was member of the Danish Parliament 1973-75 and again 1977–2001. He was minister of traffic in the Conservative Poul Schlüter coalition government 1982–86, and Minister for Communication and Tourism in the Social Democratic Poul Nyrup Rasmussen coalition government 1993–94.

He represented his party in parliament's Foreign Policy Committee 1994–2001, when he was forced to step down after having publicly defended Israel's use of moderate physical coercion on terror suspects. He later chose to leave the Centre Democratic Parliamentary group. The Centre Democrats lost their representation in parliament in the parliamentary election of 2001. The party was dissolved on 1 February 2008.

Melchior died on 24 September 2016, aged 91.

Others
1975–79, Melchior headed the Danish Zionist Federation.

References

External links
Danish Zionist Federation

1924 births
2016 deaths
Danish Jews
Danish Zionists
Communication ministers of Denmark
Tourism ministers of Denmark
Transport ministers of Denmark
Members of the Folketing
Arne
Jewish Danish politicians
MEPs for Denmark 1989–1994
Social Democrats (Denmark) politicians
Centre Democrats (Denmark) politicians